Holy Land Hardball (2008) is a documentary film about starting a professional baseball league in Israel. It is the story of the founding of the Israel Baseball League.

Synopsis
Boston bagel maker Larry Baras, who had no sports management experience, wanted to create a professional baseball league in Israel. He recruited former Jewish major leaguers Art Shamsky, Ken Holtzman, and Ron Blomberg as team managers in the Israel Baseball League.

Film festivals
It premiered at the Silverdocs AFI/Discovery Channel Documentary Film Festival and was shown at many other film festivals.

Reviews
Fandango.com says of Holy Land Hardball:

Indiewire.com says of Holy Land Hardball:

References

External links
 

2008 films
2008 documentary films
2000s sports films
American sports documentary films
Documentary films about baseball
American independent films
Israel Baseball League
Documentary films about Jews and Judaism
Documentary films about Israel
2000s English-language films
2000s American films